Coca-Cola Zero Sugar is a diet cola produced by The Coca-Cola Company. In some countries it is sold as Coca-Cola No Sugar.

The drink was introduced in 2005 as Coca-Cola Zero as a new no-calorie cola. In 2017, the formula was modified and the name updated, a change which led to some backlash. Another formula change occurred in the UK in July 2021, in the USA in August 2021 and in Canada in September 2021.

History
Coca-Cola Zero was Coca-Cola's largest product launch in 22 years. The global campaign was developed by creative agency Crispin Porter + Bogusky. It was marketed as having a taste that is indistinguishable from standard Coca-Cola, as opposed to Diet Coke, which has a different flavor profile.

2017 reformulation 
In 2017, despite increasing sales in the United States, the Coca-Cola Company announced that Coca-Cola Zero would be reformulated and rebranded as Coca-Cola Zero Sugar, intended to taste more like standard Coca-Cola while emphasizing the lack of sugar content. The new formula was first tested in the United Kingdom in June 2016, with plans to roll it out in other countries in the following months.

The move caused some vocal backlash. The Washington Post noted Coke Zero is very popular, and that fans compared the change to the launch of New Coke in 1985. However, Beverage Digest executive editor Duane Stanford noted that it was very similar in flavor, and that the formula likely was tweaked only slightly as the ingredients list is the same. He noted that the rebranding was the main emphasis.

In Australia, the soda was relaunched as "Coca-Cola No Sugar" in 2017 but had trouble gaining initial acceptance.

In July 2018, it was confirmed that the original formula would continue to be sold under the original Coke Zero branding in New Zealand alongside the Coke Zero Sugar product. The original Coke Zero branding was finally phased out in 2022 alongside the local launch of the 2021 reformulation.

2021 reformulation 
In July 2021, the Coca-Cola Company announced that another reformulation of Coca-Cola Zero Sugar would be released throughout the U.S. in August and then throughout Canada in September. The reformulation would be the same recipe that was already available in Europe and Latin America. The company said the recipe would "optimize existing...flavors and existing ingredients" without requiring a change in the listed ingredients or nutritional information. Along with the reformulation, the labeling would be updated.

Logo 
The original Coca-Cola Zero logo generally featured the Coca-Cola logo in red script with white trim, with the word "zero" underneath in lower case in the geometric typeface Avenir (or a customized version of it). These words appeared on a black background. Some details varied from country to country. Later packagings swapped the colors of the "Coca-Cola" script and "Zero", leaving the former in white and the latter in red.

The first Coca-Cola Zero Sugar logo featured the Coca-Cola logo in white script, with the words "zero sugar" in black underneath; the word "zero" in lower case in the geometric typeface Avenir (or a customized version of it) and the word "sugar" in upper case. These words appeared in a red disc on a black background. In European markets, the packaging instead matches the classic Coca-Cola red design with the addition of a black band around the top of the label with the text "zero sugar". After the 2021 reformulation, the red disc was removed and the logo was changed to black text on a red background, the color of the background changing for certain flavors.

Ingredients 
All versions of Coca-Cola Zero Sugar sold in various countries are based on the same flavoring formula, and all are carbonated. One liter of Coca-Cola Zero Sugar contains 96 mg caffeine. Additionally, artificial sweeteners are used. In the U.S., this includes aspartame and acesulfame potassium. However, the exact combination of sweeteners and preservatives used varies from market to market.

Sweeteners and health concerns 
Sodium cyclamate, a relatively inexpensive artificial sweetener banned by the U.S. Food and Drug Administration (FDA) since 1969 and once believed to be a carcinogen, has been used in the Coca-Cola Zero versions produced in Germany, Italy, Spain, Portugal, Venezuela, Chile, and some Central American countries. It was used for a time in Mexico, before a consumer campaign led to its removal from the drink in 2008. In June 2009, Venezuela ordered Coca-Cola to withdraw its Coca-Cola Zero product, as it contained more than the legal levels of sodium cyclamate.

Marketing 

Coke Zero was originally specifically marketed to men, who are shown to associate "diet" drinks with women. It was primarily marketed towards young adult males and it has been nicknamed "Bloke Coke" in the UK. In the U.S., advertising has been tailored to its targeted market by describing the drink as "calorie-free" rather than "diet", since young adult males are said to associate diet drinks with women. U.S. marketing also emphasized its similarity in taste to sugared Coca-Cola; an advertising campaign for the beverage focused on Coca-Cola executives who were so angry over the drinks' similarities, they were considering suing their co-workers for "taste infringement". Continuing the theme, a Coca-Cola Zero ad aired during Super Bowl XLIII parodied Coke's iconic "Hey Kid, Catch!" commercial, which is interrupted by two Coca-Cola "brand managers" accusing Troy Polamalu of "stealing" their commercial.

In Australia, the product's launch was promoted by a fake front group; the campaign included outdoor graffiti and online spamming that mentioned a fake blog. Once exposed, consumer advocates assailed the campaign as misleading and established the Zero Coke Movement to comment on the ethics of Coke's activities.

Coca-Cola Zero sponsors Bundesliga club Borussia Dortmund, the NASCAR Cup Series Coke Zero Sugar 400 at Daytona International Speedway in August, and also the Suzuka 8 Hours in Japan, a motorcycle endurance race.

In 2013, Coca-Cola swapped the logo on Coca-Cola, Diet Coke, and Coke Zero bottles and cans in many European countries with 150 of the most popular local names for a summer-long "Share a Coke" campaign. The same campaign was used in North America the following summer.

For Christmas 2013, Coke Zero launched an interactive website that allowed people to customize the designs of their Christmas sweater, which have a significant role in United Kingdom Christmas traditions. On the website, people could detail the cut, pattern, and icons for their sweater, and join a popularity contest. Users could choose designs from Christmas trees and Santa's head to reindeer, sleighs, and turkeys. This initiative was tied to a social media campaign, where the top 100 sweater designs with the most votes were manufactured and shipped to the contest winners. According to the Coca-Cola Company, the website generated nearly 42,000 sweater designs in its first four days.

Variants

References

External links

 

Diet drinks
Coca-Cola cola brands
Food and drink introduced in 2005
Caffeinated soft drinks